Adrien van Viersen is a storyboard artist located in Vancouver, British Columbia, Canada. His credits include, Romeo Must Die, X2, X-Men 3, pilot episode of Smallville and Fantastic Four: Rise of the Silver Surfer. He was also nominated for the Russ Manning Award for his comic book series Technopolis, published by Caliber Comics.

External links
 

Canadian storyboard artists
Living people
Year of birth missing (living people)